Gunnera tinctoria, known as giant rhubarb or Chilean rhubarb, is a flowering plant species native to southern Chile and neighbouring zones in Argentina. It is unrelated to rhubarb, as the two plants belong into different orders, but looks similar from a distance and has similar culinary uses. It is a large-leaved  perennial plant that grows to more than two metres tall. It has been introduced to many parts of the world as an ornamental plant and in some countries (for instance New Zealand, Great Britain and Ireland) it has spread from gardens and is becoming a weed problem. It is known under the synonyms: Gunnera chilensis Lam. and Gunnera scabra Ruiz & Pav.

Taxonomy 
It was first described in 1782 by Juan Ignacio Molina as Panke tinctoria, and was transferred to the genus, Gunnera, in 1805 by Charles-François Brisseau de Mirbel.

Description
Gunnera tinctoria is a giant, clump-forming herbaceous perennial. The leaves can grow up to 2.5m across, cordate and palmate with up to 9-lobed margins. It has erect spikes of cone-shaped inflorescences (to 1m) from spring to early summer, with small flowers. The fruit is orange. The number of seeds is estimated from 80,000 per seedhead to 250,000 per plant.

Habitat
Stream and roadsides.

Uses

In its native Chile, where it is called nalca or pangue, it is used in a similar way to European rhubarb: the stalks are eaten fresh or cooked into jam or cordial. The leaves are used in the preparation of the traditional Chilean dish curanto.

As an invasive species
In parts of New Zealand the Chilean rhubarb has become a recognised pest plant. For instance in Taranaki, on the west coast of the North Island it was spread to riverbeds, coastal cliffs and forest margins.  G. tinctoria is on the National Pest Plant Accord. Under Section 52 and 53 of the Biosecurity Act, it is an offence to knowingly propagate, distribute, spread, sell, offer for sale. In Great Britain it has become well-established and sometimes problematic in western districts and appears to be spreading. In the west of Ireland, G. tinctoria is a major invasive species, in particular on Achill Island and on Corraun Peninsula, County Mayo. Its large leaves create dense shade, preventing other species from germinating or growing. 

Chilean rhubarb is classified in the European Union as an invasive species of Union concern, and it is illegal to import, grow, or sell it within the EU.

Similar species
A similar species is Gunnera manicata (Brazilian giant rhubarb). This species may also be invasive.

In popular culture
In October of 2019, photos of a produce vendor in Puerto Montt dressing himself in nalca leaves began circulating on Chilean social media under the name "Nalcaman". Because these photos were being shared around the same time as the beginning of the 2019–20 Chilean protests, Nalcaman has since become an element of the iconography surrounding Chile's anti-government protests.

Notes
 The blue-green alga Nostoc is a symbiont in Gunnera.

References

Further reading
 
 Department of Conservation (NZ) - Plant me instead. Wellington (New Zealand) 2005. 
 Department of Conservation - leaflet: "Chilean Rhubarb; shading out our natives", Wanganui. March 2006.

External links

 Gunnera tinctoria
 Gunnera tinctoria at Biosecurity New Zealand
 images

tinctoria
Flora of Chile
Edible plants
Garden plants
Flora of the Valdivian temperate rainforest